Penn Yan Airport  is a county-owned public-use airport located one nautical mile (1.8 km) south of the central business district of the Penn Yan, a village in Yates County, New York, United States. It is also known as Penn Yan - Yates County Airport.

Although most U.S. airports use the same three-letter location identifier for the FAA and IATA, this airport is assigned PEO by the FAA but has no designation from the IATA.

Facilities and aircraft 
It has two asphalt paved runways: 1/19 is 5,500 by 100 feet (1,676 x 30 m) and 10/28 is 3,561 by 50 feet (1,085 x 15 m).

For the 12-month period ending June 23, 2006, the airport had 21,200 aircraft operations, an average of 58 per day: 76% general aviation and 24% air taxi. At that time there were 37 aircraft based at this airport: 81% single-engine, 5% multi-engine and 14% jet.

The airport is managed and operated by Seneca Flight Operations, which is part of the Seneca Foods Corporation. According to Bob Multer, Former Chairman of the Yates County Legislature, "This unique public/private partnership has enabled our small county to own and operate an airport a virtually no cost to the local taxpayer". According to the National Air Transportation Association, the Penn Yan / Yates County Airport is one of "America's 100 most needed airports".

References

External links 
 Seneca Flight Operations, the Fixed-Base Operator (FBO)
 Penn Yan Airport, Official website of the airport
 From Fltplan.com, Airport Specifications and information
 Aerial photo as of 5 April 1995 from USGS The National Map via MSR Maps
  at NYSDOT airport directory
 

Airports in New York (state)
Transportation in Yates County, New York